Sacred Heart Academy was a regional, female-only Catholic school for grades 9–12, founded in 1922 under the Roman Catholic Diocese of Bridgeport.  It was located at 200 Strawberry Hill Avenue in Stamford, Connecticut and served parts of Fairfield County, Connecticut and Westchester County, New York. It closed in 2006 due to "declining enrollment and financial difficulties."

See also
Education in Stamford, Connecticut

Notes

External links
Sacred Heart Academy of Stamford,

Schools in Fairfield County, Connecticut
Education in Stamford, Connecticut
Defunct schools in Connecticut
Defunct Catholic secondary schools in the United States
Roman Catholic Diocese of Bridgeport
1922 establishments in Connecticut